The  is Japanese wheeled self-propelled gun. The vehicle is designed to replace Japan's inventory of FH70 Towed Howitzers.

Development 
In 2011, the Japanese Ministry of Defense (MOD) evaluated a proposal to develop a vehicle capable of networking with other systems and performing shoot-and-scoot tactics to replace the FH70. The MOD's evaluation finished in 2012 and requested 6.4 billion yen be invested into the development of the vehicle in the FY 2013 defense budget; with development and testing occurring between 2013 and 2016. Research and development of the 155 mm wheeled howitzer was granted in the FY 2013 defense budget, although the budget was lowered to 1.4 billion yen.

On 31 May 2018, the Acquisition, Technology & Logistics Agency (ATLA) received 5 prototypes from Japan Steel Works for testing and evaluation.

Seven wheeled howitzers were procured for training purpose in the FY 2019 defense budget for a total of 5.1 billion yen.

The artillery was officially unveiled in the 2019 East Fuji Maneuver Area.

Design 
The vehicle features an L52 155 mm gun mounted on the back of an 8x8 truck chassis. Compared to the towed FH70, the wheeled howitzer is designed to be mobile and networked to a Firing Command and Control System, which receives targeting information from artillery observers.

According to the FY 2013 defense budget request, the wheeled howitzer features the barrel part used on the Type 99 155 mm self-propelled howitzer and body of a heavy wheeled recovery vehicle to reduce development cost. The truck chassis is a RMMV HX 8x8 military truck.

See also

Archer
ATMOS 2000
A-222 Bereg
2S22 Bohdana
CAESAR
DANA
G6 Rhino
AHS Kryl
Nora B-52
PCL-09
PCL-161
PCL-181
PLL-09
ZUZANA

References 

155 mm artillery
Artillery of Japan
Wheeled self-propelled howitzers
Military vehicles introduced in the 2010s